Histocidaridae is a family of sea urchins.

References

 Thuy B, Gale AS, Kroh A, Kucera M, Numberger-Thuy LD, Reich M, et al. (2012) Ancient Origin of the Modern Deep-Sea Fauna. PLoS ONE 7(10): e46913, 
 Kroh, A. & Smith, A.B. (2010): The phylogeny and classification of post-Palaeozoic echinoids. Journal of Systematic Palaeontology, 8/2, pages 147-212

 
Monogeneric deuterostome families
Prehistoric echinoderm families
Extant Early Cretaceous first appearances